Tamisiocarididae is a family of radiodonts, extinct marine animals related to arthropods, that bore finely-spined appendages that were presumably used in filter-feeding. When first discovered, the clade was named Cetiocaridae after a speculative evolution artwork, Bearded Ceticaris by John Meszaros, that depicted a hypothetical filter-feeding radiodont at a time before any were known to exist. However, the family name was not valid according to the International Code of Zoological Nomenclature, as no real genus named "Cetiocaris" exists, and in 2019 it was formally replaced by the name Tamisiocarididae, after the only valid genus of the clade at the time. The family is only known from Series 2 of the Cambrian, unlike other radiodont families, which persisted longer into the Cambrian. All known species would have lived in tropical or subtropical waters, suggesting a preference for warmer waters.

Description
Like most radiodonts, cetiocarids have spiny frontal appendages. However, in this family the auxiliary spines are fine and densely-arranged, which are modified for use in filter feeding like modern basking sharks and mysticete whales.  For example, Tamisocaris is estimated to have fed on prey roughly a millimeter in size.

Classification

Tamisiocarididae was originally named Cetiocaridae. In the 2013 speculative paleoart book All Your Yesterdays, paleoartist John Meszaros depicted a hypothetical filter-feeding anomalocaridid he named "Ceticaris". This artwork inspired the name of Cetiocaridae. However, as no genus "Cetiocaris" actually exists, the name Cetiocaridae does not comply with article 29 of the International Code of Zoological Nomenclature and is invalid. The family Tamisiocarididae was subsequently devised as a replacement name for the clade.
Cetiocaridae was originally defined phylogenetically as all species more closely related to Tamisiocaris borealis than to Anomalocaris canadensis, Amplectobelua symbrachiata, or Hurdia victoria.

Distribution

Tamisocaridid fossils have been found in the Emu Bay Shale of Australia, Sirius Passet lagerstätte of Greenland, and Kinzers Formation of the United States. Their fossils date to stage 3 and stage 4 of the Cambrian.

References

External links
 Bearded Ceticaris by John Meszaros

Cambrian arthropods
Prehistoric arthropod families